Richard Elis (born 1975) is a Welsh actor. He was brought up in the Amman Valley, Wales.

He trained at the Welsh College of Music and Drama and graduated in 1996, aged 21 Days before he graduated, Elis was asked to audition for London casting agents and was subsequently cast in the BBC soap opera EastEnders as the serial's first Welsh character, Huw Edwards. Elis was initially only scripted to appear in three episodes, but the producers liked the portrayal and his contract was extended. Elis remained in the soap for three years, leaving in 1999 as he feared typecasting.

He went on to appear in S4C’s critically acclaimed drama Ar Y Tracs, Pobol Y Cwm, numerous theatre productions as well as roles in the HTV (now ITV Wales) drama series Nuts and Bolts, The Bill, Casualty and Doctors. He has also appeared in a variety of adverts for products and brands such as Wicked, Bisto, McLeans, Sky, Peugeot, Renault, a Dutch milk company in the Netherlands and notably in the WKD adverts.
He has also appeared in numerous independent British Films including Benny and Jolene, Black Mountain Poets, Songbird and Wild Honey Pie! In August 2006, Elis provided the voice of "Welsh Big Brother" as part of a task during series seven of the (then) Channel 4 reality television series Big Brother. During the aforementioned task, housemates had to talk to Big Brother in Welsh whilst in the diary room. Out of the remaining contestants, Glyn Wise was the only one who was from Wales and a fluent Welsh speaker. In 2021, he appeared in the BBC drama series The Pact.

Elis is married to Pobol Y Cwm actress Tonya Smith, who plays Yvonne in the Welsh soap opera. They married in 1998 and have two daughters.

References

External links

1975 births
Living people
Welsh male soap opera actors
Welsh male television actors
Welsh-speaking actors